Charles Lewis "Ookie" Miller (November 11, 1909 – August 7, 2002) was a professional American football player. Miller played seven years in the National Football League (NFL), mainly for the Chicago Bears.

References

External links

1909 births
2002 deaths
American football centers
Chicago Bears players
Cleveland Rams players
Green Bay Packers players
Purdue Boilermakers football players
People from Marion, Indiana
Players of American football from Indiana